Brit Awards 2009  was the 29th edition of the British Phonographic Industry's annual Brit Awards. The awards ceremony was held at Earls Court in London, and was broadcast live on ITV on 18 February at 8pm (GMT). Duffy became the first female artist to ever win three awards in the same year, and only Blur, in 1995, have ever won more awards at a single ceremony. The show was advertised as live by ITV but the broadcast included several audio deletions which means the show was shown on a time delay system. The 2009 Brit Awards ceremony was watched by 5.49 million people and was the 32nd most watched programme on TV on the week ending 22 February.

Hosts
Kylie Minogue, Mathew Horne and James Corden hosted the 2009 edition of the Brit Awards, with Fearne Cotton presenting backstage.  Fearne also hosted the launch party for ITV2 in January.

Johnny Vegas introduced and closed the event, as well as reading out the nominees in a pre-recorded voiceover. Emma B provided the live voiceovers as the artists came to the stage.

Rufus Hound, Sara Cox, Melanie Blatt and Nicole Appleton presented the Red Carpet and Encore events on ITV2.

Alesha Dixon presented a backstage programme, screened on ITV two days after the ceremony.

Performances

Winners and nominees

Multiple nominations and awards

Memorable moments

Girls Aloud
British reality band, Girls Aloud, marked their first ever performance at the 2009 ceremony, by performing their single, "The Promise". The performance saw the band members, including Cheryl and Nicola Roberts appear as though they were naked, with their modesty being covered by pink feathers. This performance was nominated in the 2010 ceremony for the "BRITs Hits 30 – Best Live Performance at the BRIT Awards", alongside Oasis and The Who, which the Spice Girls eventually went on to win. "The Promise" won best British single, their first ever BRIT award.

Mick Kluczynski
Ten days before the 2009 Brits, Mick Kluczynski, the production manager for the Brits since 1995 who assisted with the transition from the Fleetwood/Fox debacle to the scale of the current ceremony, died. Despite this setback the team he put in place ensured that everything went as planned, and the show was dedicated to his memory.

References

External links
Brit Awards 2009 at Brits.co.uk

Brit Awards
Brit Awards, 2009
Brit Awards, 2009
Brit
Brit Awards
Brit Awards